The 1986 World Series  was the championship series of Major League Baseball's (MLB) 1986 season. The 83rd edition of the World Series, it was a best-of-seven playoff played between the National League (NL) champion New York Mets and the American League (AL) champion Boston Red Sox. The Mets won the series four games to three to claim their second World Series title and first since 1969.

The series is best remembered for its Game 6, which saw the Mets rally from a two run-deficit in the bottom of the 10th inning, despite having two outs and no one on base. The Red Sox, who held a 3–2 series lead, were twice one strike away from securing the championship, but failed to close out the inning as the Mets won off an error by Boston first baseman Bill Buckner. Due to the Mets claiming the series in Game 7, the Game 6 collapse entered baseball lore as part of the Curse of the Bambino superstition used to explain the Red Sox's championship drought after the 1918 World Series.

The 1986 World Series marked the second time, after the previous year's series, in which the winning team lost the first two games of the series at home. It was also the first World Series to use the designated hitter only in games played at the American League representative's stadium, a policy that was maintained until the National League's adoption of the DH in 2022.

Background

New York Mets

The New York Mets finished the regular season with a franchise-best record of 108–54, winning the National League East division by  games over the division rival Philadelphia Phillies. They then won a tightly contested 1986 National League Championship Series against the Houston Astros, 4 games to 2, clinching the series with a 7–6, 16-inning win in Game 6. On July 19, Mets' infielder Tim Teufel and pitchers Rick Aguilera, Bobby Ojeda, and Ron Darling were arrested after fighting with policemen outside a bar in Houston. Just three days later, the Mets played a game in Cincinnati that saw Ray Knight, Darryl Strawberry, and Kevin Mitchell get ejected, forcing starting catcher Gary Carter to play third base and the Mets to play a pitcher in the outfield, with lefty Jesse Orosco and right-hander Roger McDowell alternating between the pitcher's mound and the outfield as needed. Despite the adversity, the Mets won the game, 6–3 in 14 innings, on a three-run homer by Howard Johnson.

Boston Red Sox

Boston went 95–66 during the season, winning the American League East division by  games over their biggest nemesis, the New York Yankees.  The gritty play of eventual ALCS MVP Marty Barrett and Rich Gedman; clutch hitting from veterans Jim Rice, Wade Boggs, Don Baylor, Dwight Evans and Dave Henderson; and quality starting pitching, especially from 1986 American League MVP and Cy Young Award winner Roger Clemens, Bruce Hurst and Oil Can Boyd, pushed the Red Sox to the World Series. The team's defining moment occurred in Game 5 of the 1986 American League Championship Series against the California Angels. With the Angels leading three games to one in the best-of-seven series and their top reliever Donnie Moore on the mound, the Sox needed a last-out miracle home run from Henderson to survive Game 5; they later loaded the bases and got the go-ahead run on a sacrifice fly from Henderson off Moore in the 11th. The Angels never recovered from this blow, and with Boston capitalizing on some defensive miscues by the Angels, and clutch performances by some of their big name players (namely Rice and Clemens in the deciding game), the Red Sox clinched the pennant with a seven-game series win.

Summary

†: postponed from October 26 due to rain

Matchups

Game 1

Just as they did against Houston in the National League Championship Series, the Mets opened the World Series by taking a 1–0 defeat. Boston's Bruce Hurst dominated the Mets with his forkball and looping curve, allowing only four hits over eight innings to get the win. In the bottom of the sixth, Hurst got Ray Knight to ground into an inning-ending double play and thwart a scoring opportunity for the Mets.

New York's Ron Darling was equally effective, yielding only one unearned run in the seventh inning when second baseman Tim Teufel committed an error by letting a ground ball from Rich Gedman go through his legs, allowing Jim Rice to score from second. Red Sox closer  Calvin Schiraldi, acquired from the Mets in the previous offseason, walked Darryl Strawberry to lead off the bottom of the ninth inning. However, Schiraldi got Knight to force out Strawberry at second base and then got Wally Backman to fly out to left field. With two outs, Danny Heep pinch hit for Rafael Santana. Schiraldi worked Heep to a 2–2 count and then struck him out swinging to solidify the victory.

Mets' legend Tom Seaver, now a member of the Red Sox, received a standing ovation from the Shea Stadium fans during the Game 1 introductions. Seaver did not pitch in the series because of a knee injury.

Game 2

Game 2 figured to be a classic pitching matchup, between the Mets' young phenom Dwight Gooden and Boston's own young pitching sensation Roger Clemens, but neither pitcher went beyond five innings. The Red Sox scored first in the top of the third inning, following a leadoff walk to Spike Owen, when Keith Hernandez fielded a Clemens bunt, but threw it away trying to catch Owen at second base. Wade Boggs then drove in Owen with a double, Marty Barrett drove in Clemens with a single, and Bill Buckner drove in Boggs with a single to give the Sox a 3–0 lead. In the bottom half of the inning, the Mets had on second and third base for Wally Backman, who grounded up the middle, plating Rafael Santana. Hernandez then grounded out, allowing Gooden to score and bring the Mets within one run.

In the top of the fourth inning, Dave Henderson, the hero of the ALCS, drove the second pitch from Gooden to left-center field for a home run. Dwight Evans followed with a two-run home run in the top of the fifth inning, bringing the score to 6–2. Although Clemens had a comfortable lead going into the bottom of the fifth, he was pulled in favor of Steve Crawford after facing three batters, leaving runners on first and third. Crawford promptly gave up a single to Gary Carter that scored Backman, cutting the deficit to three runs. Crawford struck out Darryl Strawberry and got Danny Heep to ground out, but this left Clemens with a no decision.

Gooden was relieved by Rick Aguilera in the sixth inning. Aguilera loaded the bases in the seventh, and after consecutive RBI singles by Henderson and Owen, was pulled in favor of Jesse Orosco, who shut down the Red Sox over the next two innings.

The Red Sox were not done, however. Facing Sid Fernandez, pitching in relief with runners on first and second base in the ninth inning, Boggs drove in Henderson with a double to make the score 9–3. The Mets were unable to recover from this deficit, and took the loss, giving Boston a 2–0 advantage heading to Fenway Park.

Game 3

The Mets started well when Lenny Dykstra led off the game with a home run. After two singles, Gary Carter followed with an RBI double, and Danny Heep drove in two runners with a single to give the Mets a 4–0 lead in the first inning. After the rocky start, Red Sox starter Oil Can Boyd settled down, but Bob Ojeda pitched well and Boston was unable to overcome their early deficit. In his first at bat of the World Series, Boston's Don Baylor almost homered in the second inning but hit the Green Monster, resulting in a double.

Ojeda gave up an RBI single to Marty Barrett in the bottom of the third inning, but this would be the only Boston run of the game. Carter drove in two runners with a bases-loaded single in the seventh inning, and Ray Knight drove in Darryl Strawberry, who had singled and moved to third on two wild pitches, with a double in the eighth inning off of Joe Sambito. Roger McDowell pitched the final two frames to seal a 7–1 Mets victory.

Game 4

Ron Darling faced off against Boston's Al Nipper, as the Mets looked to tie the Series. Neither starter allowed a run until the top of the fourth inning, when Gary Carter ripped a two-run home run over the Green Monster and Ray Knight drove in Darryl Strawberry, who had doubled after the home run, with a single. Lenny Dykstra hit a two-run home run of his own in the top of the seventh inning, and Carter hit a shot in the top of the eighth inning, both off of Steve Crawford.

In the eighth inning, the Red Sox scored two runs on a Dwight Evans single and a Dave Henderson sacrifice fly off of Roger McDowell, but it was not enough, and the Mets evened the series at two games apiece to ensure a return to New York.

Game 5

The Red Sox struck first in the second when Dave Henderson tripled with one out off of Dwight Gooden and scored on Spike Owen's sacrifice fly. Dwight Evans's RBI single next inning with two on made it 2–0 Red Sox. In the fifth, Jim Rice hit a leadoff triple and scored on Don Baylor's single. After Evans singled, Sid Fernandez relieved Gooden and allowed an RBI double to Henderson. Bruce Hurst pitched  shutout innings before Tim Teufel's home run in the eighth put the Mets on the board. In the ninth, Mookie Wilson doubled with two outs and scored on Rafael Santana's single before Hurst struck out Lenny Dykstra to end the game as the Red Sox's 4–2 gave them a 3–2 series lead heading back to New York.

Game 6

The series returned to Shea Stadium for Game 6, with the Mets facing elimination. Bob Ojeda, the winner of Game 3, returned to the mound for New York. The Red Sox countered with their ace Roger Clemens, who despite the team’s victory in his Game 2 start did not factor into the decision as he was pulled from the game in the fifth inning. 

In the first two innings, Boston took a quick 2–0 lead on RBI base hits from Dwight Evans and Marty Barrett. The Mets tied the score in the fifth inning on a single from Ray Knight and a run-scoring double play by Danny Heep, in his last at-bat as a Met.

After the Mets left the go-ahead run on base in the sixth, the Red Sox came to bat in the top of the seventh  against New York reliever Roger McDowell. Barrett started off the inning by drawing a walk, then advanced to second on a groundout by Bill Buckner. Jim Rice then hit a ground ball to third that Knight misplayed, putting runners on the corners with one out. McDowell then got Evans to ground out to the left side, but since Boston had called for a hit-and-run, the Mets were unable to convert a double play and get out of the inning; Barrett scored on the groundout to give the Red Sox the lead. The Mets avoided further damage, though, as Rice was thrown out at home after trying to score from second on a single by Rich Gedman for the third out. 

In the top of the eighth, McDowell walked Dave Henderson to start the inning. After Spike Owen laid down a sacrifice bunt, advancing Henderson to second, the pitcher’s spot was due next. Although Clemens had struck out eight Mets batters and had only allowed one earned run to this point in the game, manager John McNamara decided to call for a pinch hitter. Despite having power hitting veteran Don Baylor on his bench, McNamara chose to send up rookie Mike Greenwell as he felt the matchup against McDowell favored him. Greenwell responded by striking out on three pitches. After intentionally walking Wade Boggs next, McDowell walked Barrett to load the bases. Jesse Orosco came in to face Buckner, inducing a first-pitch fly out to end the inning. 

It was initially said that Clemens was removed from the game due to a blister forming on one of his fingers, but both he and McNamara dispute this. Clemens said to Bob Costas on an MLB Network program concerning the 1986 postseason that McNamara decided to pull him despite Clemens wanting to pitch. McNamara said to Costas that Clemens "begged out" of the game.

Regardless of who was telling the truth, McNamara had been warming closer Calvin Schiraldi in the bullpen for some time and brought him in the bottom of the eighth inning for a potential two-inning save. Pinch hitter Lee Mazzilli led off the inning with a single. Lenny Dykstra then reached on an attempted sacrifice to put two runners on. Wally Backman followed with another bunt to move Mazzilli and Dykstra into scoring position, and Schiraldi intentionally walked Keith Hernandez to load the bases for Gary Carter. Schiraldi ran up a 3–0 count on Carter, but Carter swung at the next pitch and flied to left, deep enough to score Mazzilli and tie the game. With Dykstra now on third, Darryl Strawberry stood in with a chance to drive in the go-ahead run, but flied out to end the inning.

After the Red Sox failed to score against Rick Aguilera in the top of the ninth, the Mets came up with a chance to win the game. Knight started the inning by drawing a walk off Schiraldi. Mookie Wilson was then asked to lay down a bunt to try to move the runner up to second. The bunt landed directly in front of home plate and catcher Gedmansaw he had a play at second and threw there to try and get the lead runner. His throw was high, however, and pulled shortstop Owen off the base long enough for Knight to slide in safely. Owen, Barrett, and McNamara argued that second base umpire Jim Evans made the wrong call, with McNamara saying he could not have seen Owen's foot land back on the bag, but television replays showed that Knight's hand touched just before Owen got his foot back down.

With a runner now in scoring position and still nobody out, Howard Johnson came on to pinch hit. Mets manager Davey Johnson had been expected by the Red Sox to call for a bunt in order to move Knight to third base, where he could score on a deep fly ball, but the play was not called and Johnson struck out. Schiraldi then got Mazzilli out on a fly ball to left, failing to advance Knight to third, and followed that up with another fly out off the bat of Dykstra to end the inning and move the game to extra innings.

In the visiting tenth, Henderson hit Aguilera's second pitch of the inning out of the park for a 4–3 Boston lead. After getting Owen to strike out, the first of two opportunities for McNamara to utilize his bench, where he had several pinch-hitting options including Baylor still available, came up with the pitcher's spot now due. McNamara, however, sent Schiraldi to the plate despite having both Joe Sambito and Bob Stanley, the latter having not recorded a single earned run in the postseason to that point, in the bullpen ready to go. Aguilera retired Schiraldi on a strikeout for the second out.

Boggs then followed with a double, and Barrett drove him in with a single to give the Red Sox an insurance run and a 5–3 lead. The second chance for McNamara to use his bench followed. The veteran first baseman Buckner was the next batter, and in many cases where Boston would be leading late in games McNamara would take Buckner out and replace him with Dave Stapleton at first base, as he had done in all three previous Red Sox victories in this series. This time, he did not, even after Aguilera drilled the veteran first baseman in the hip with a pitch. Rice, the next batter, ended the inning with a flyout to Mazzilli.

When asked later about his decision to leave Buckner in the game, McNamara initially said that he felt that he deserved to stay on the field for the potential final out to preserve the victory and the championship. Buckner, after all, was the third-oldest Red Sox player behind Baylor and Tom Seaver, (who was not on the postseason roster), and was an 18-year veteran who had only seen action in one prior World Series, which came when he was a member of the Los Angeles Dodgers in the 1974 World Series. Years later, McNamara changed his story and said that the reason why had nothing to do with sentimentality and instead said that Stapleton, who said McNamara's decision cost the Red Sox the series, was not a reliable defender and that his teammates had taken to calling him "Shaky" as a result; in spite of McNamara's assertion, Stapleton had only committed one error at first base since Buckner joined the Red Sox in 1984 and, in his last two full seasons at first base, had recorded fielding percentages of .991 and .992 respectively.

Needing to rally for the second time in three innings, and now having to overcome a two-run deficit, the Mets' first two batters in the tenth went quietly against Schiraldi. Backman flew out to left, and Hernandez flew out to center. 
Umpire Harry Wendelstedt who was working 3rd Base that night asked Wade Boggs if he could have his hat since he collected the hats of winning third basemans but with still one out to go, Boggs told Wendelstedt it wasn't over yet.
With Carter now New York's last hope, the words "Congratulations Boston Red Sox, 1986 World Champions" briefly and accidentally flashed on the scoreboard. The celebration was put on hold as Carter singled to bring the tying run to the plate.

Had he not come out in the ninth inning, Strawberry would have been the next batter. Because of the double switch, the pitcher took his spot in the lineup and Aguilera was due up. Johnson had decided to send rookie utility man Kevin Mitchell up to pinch hit for the young reliever, who was at the moment the pitcher of record.

Mitchell, however, was not in the dugout. It has been said (and later denied by Mitchell) that since he believed the game was over after Hernandez flew out, the rookie went back into the clubhouse and took his uniform off, deciding to get a head start on booking a flight back home. Someone had to be sent into the clubhouse to get him, and Mitchell had to rush to get his uniform back on to come and take his at bat. Despite the rush, the rookie utility man came through with a single of his own, advancing Carter to second and putting the tying runs on base with Knight, now the potential winning run, coming up.

Schiraldi got two quick strikes on the Mets' third baseman, who had already driven in one run so far. However, with his team within one strike of that elusive championship, he could not finish the job as Knight singled to left-center. Carter scored from second standing up and the speedy Mitchell advanced to third. Finally, McNamara decided his closer had seen enough and called for the veteran Stanley to try to close out the game. Some later speculated as to why Stanley, who had been warmed up by the time the tenth inning began, had not been called upon earlier instead of McNamara asking for a third inning out of Schiraldi, who had already blown the save.

The Mets' next batter was Wilson, who had recorded one hit and reached on a fielder's choice after the bad throw by Gedman in the ninth. Six pitches into the at-bat, with the count even at two balls and two strikes, Stanley threw a breaking ball that broke sharply inside and bounced in front of Wilson, who fell down trying to avoid it. Gedman tried to field the ball but could not, and it rolled to the backstop. From his knees, Wilson signaled to Mitchell to come down from third and he scored easily, tying the score at five.

Knight advanced to second on the wild pitch. Several times during the ensuing series of pitches, second baseman Barrett realized that Knight was straying too far from the base and that if he could get Stanley to turn and throw to him, he would have an easy pickoff play and the inning could have ended there. Despite his best attempts, Barrett never was able to get Stanley to hear him as the sellout crowd at Shea Stadium was drowning him out, and Stanley instead chose to focus on getting Wilson out.

On the tenth pitch of the at-bat, Stanley finally got Wilson to put the ball in play, forcing a ground ball to first base. Aware of Wilson's speed, veteran first baseman Bill Buckner, who was playing on the lip of the infield to protect against a hit through the first-second base hole, moved over to the foul line to try to field the ball, but it rolled between his legs and into right field. Knight rounded third and scored without a play, and the Mets tied the series at three with their 6–5 victory.

In the 2011 ESPN Films documentary Catching Hell, Buckner explained how, years after the event, he realized from watching a television replay how he had missed the ball. He said, when he played in the field, he liked to wear a very loose glove – i.e. one that was floppy. When he moved to his left to try to field Wilson's grounder and then stopped, the momentum of the leftward-moving loose glove caused the glove to close. The ball then went just past the right side of the glove.

After the top of the tenth, NBC began setting up in the visiting clubhouse for what they believed was the inevitable postgame victory celebration. The Commissioner's Trophy had been brought into the Red Sox clubhouse along with several bottles of champagne, and Bob Costas was to preside over the presentation. However, after Stanley's wild pitch in the bottom of the tenth, everything was quickly struck and removed from the room before the Red Sox returned. Costas later recalled the removal of all the equipment for the postgame celebration as being "like a scene change in a Broadway musical. In, out, gone, not a trace."

In 2011, MLB Network ranked this as the third greatest game of the preceding 50 years.
It was the last World Series game to end on an error until Game 4 of the 2020 World Series.

In the years that have followed, many fans regardless of team allegiance consider Game 6 of the 1986 World Series to be one of the greatest games ever played in the history of professional baseball.

Game 7

In the hours that followed the end of Game 6, a rainstorm passed over the New York metropolitan area. The field at Shea Stadium was inundated with water and, thus, Major League Baseball was forced to reschedule Game 7 for the next night, October 27.

Ron Darling was the scheduled starter for the Mets, who were employing a three-man rotation for the series consisting of him, Dwight Gooden, and Bob Ojeda. In his two starts so far in the series, Darling had a 1–1 record with an earned-run average of 0.00; the only run he had given up, which resulted in his Game 1 loss against Bruce Hurst, was unearned. The rainout gave him an extra day off, so he would be pitching on his normal four-day rest.

Oil Can Boyd, the #3 starter for the Red Sox, was originally scheduled to start Game 7. The Mets had gotten to him early in Game 3, which they won 7–1 to record their first win of the series. Boyd gave up four runs in the first inning of Game 3 and six overall despite pitching into the seventh, getting only one run of support in the loss.

The unscheduled day off, however, allowed Red Sox manager John McNamara to reconsider his pitching matchup for the deciding game of the series. Hurst, who was set to be awarded the Most Valuable Player award had the Red Sox been able to close out Game 6 with a victory, had gotten a third day of rest with the rainout; with this in mind, and considering that the Mets had only scored twice off of Hurst in his seventeen total innings of work in Games 1 and 5, McNamara decided to gamble on his postseason hero and gave Hurst the Game 7 nod.

After Boyd received word he was not starting the final game of the series, he went down into the visitors' clubhouse and remained in there alone for some time. McNamara dispatched pitching coach Bill Fischer to find Boyd, and Fischer discovered that the Oil Can had consumed a great deal of alcohol and was in no condition to function, much less play. Fischer moved Boyd into the manager's office where he locked the door and left him for the entire game.

In the 500th game played in World Series history, Boston got to Darling early, recording three runs in the second inning. Dwight Evans and Rich Gedman hit back to back home runs to lead the inning off and with two out, Wade Boggs drove in Dave Henderson with a single for a 3–0 Red Sox lead.

Gedman's home run was noteworthy for several reasons: It occurred on the first pitch after a delay of just over three minutes during which portable stands down the first base line had to be restored after several fans reaching for a foul ball had caused them to collapse. The subsequent pitch by Darling, which came on a two-strike count (1–2), led to Gedman's home run. However, the ball was almost caught by Darryl Strawberry, who was reaching over the right-field wall. Fortunately for the Red Sox, the ball fell out of Strawberry's glove and cleared the fence for a 2–0 Boston lead. If Strawberry had recorded the out, the inning may have ended with only one Boston run instead of three, as three batters later, Red Sox pitcher Bruce Hurst would have stepped to the plate to bat with two outs instead of in a sacrifice situation, which he successfully converted to set up Boggs' run-scoring hit.

The Mets, meanwhile, could not muster much against Hurst and through three innings had only recorded one hit.

In the fourth Henderson reached after Darling hit him with a pitch. After Spike Owen flew out, Hurst laid down a bunt that moved Henderson into scoring position. Mets manager Davey Johnson then lifted Darling from the game and brought in Sid Fernandez to face Boggs and the leading hitter of the series, Marty Barrett. Boggs managed to draw a walk, but Fernandez retired Barrett on a fly ball to right field to end the inning.

The Mets still did not have an answer for Hurst through the fourth and fifth innings, going down in order in both frames. The Red Sox, conversely, went down in order against Fernandez in the fifth and sixth, which kept the deficit at three. In the bottom of the inning, the Mets were finally able to break through against their series nemesis and turn the tide in their favor.

After Hurst got the first out when Rafael Santana grounded out, Lee Mazzilli came up to pinch-hit for Fernandez and singled. Mookie Wilson followed with a single of his own, and second baseman Tim Teufel drew a walk to load the bases. Keith Hernandez then drove the lead runners in with a single, and Wally Backman came in to run for Teufel representing the tying run.

Gary Carter was the next batter and he lifted a fly ball to Evans in right. The veteran outfielder had to dive in order to catch it, and was unable to come up with the catch. Right field umpire Dale Ford did not immediately rule that there was no catch, which crossed up Hernandez on the basepath; since the ball was ruled to be in play, he had to attempt to advance to second base. Since there was a delay in the ruling, Evans was able to throw back into the infield and force out Hernandez at second. Backman managed to score on the play to tie the game, but the Mets lost the opportunity to have Darryl Strawberry come up with a chance to drive in the go ahead run; instead, Hurst got him to fly out and escaped further damage. Hurst was lifted for a pinch hitter after this inning.

Roger McDowell entered the game for the Mets in the seventh and retired pinch-hitter Tony Armas, Boggs, and Barrett in order. McNamara called upon Game 6 loser Calvin Schiraldi to pitch the home half of the inning, despite his struggles in the extended outing he had two nights earlier. The day of rest did not help, as he immediately surrendered a home run to Ray Knight (playing in what would be his final game as a Met) leading off, giving the Mets their first lead of the game. Lenny Dykstra came up as a pinch-hitter and singled, then advanced to second on a wild pitch and scored on a single by Santana. After McDowell successfully moved Santana into scoring position, McNamara decided to take the ball from Schiraldi and brought in Joe Sambito. After putting Wilson on intentionally, Sambito walked Backman to load the bases and Hernandez followed with a sacrifice fly to score Santana and give the Mets a three-run advantage. Bob Stanley recorded the final out by getting Carter to ground out to Owen at shortstop.

Down to their last six outs, Boston had not had a runner reach base since Boggs' walk in the fourth inning. Jim Rice had recorded the last Red Sox hit, a single in the third, but had been thrown out trying to stretch it into a double. They tried to rally against McDowell in the eighth and Bill Buckner led the inning off with a single. Rice followed with another single, and Evans doubled after that to make the score 6–5 and bring Gedman to the plate with the potential go-ahead run. Needing to stop the rally, Johnson pulled McDowell in favor of his closer Jesse Orosco to face the Red Sox catcher. After inducing a line drive to second that Backman caught for the first out, Orosco struck out Henderson for the second out and then got Don Baylor, batting for Owen, to ground out and end the Boston rally.

In the bottom of the eighth, the Mets finally were able to put the game away at the expense of Game 4 loser Al Nipper. Strawberry led the inning off with a solo home run, and Knight singled and advanced to second on a groundout by Dykstra. Santana was intentionally walked to get to the pitcher's spot, but Orosco not only came to bat but also managed to drive Knight in as he swung away on a fake bunt attempt to extend the lead back to three. Steve Crawford then came in to face Wilson and hit him, loading the bases. Backman then grounded into a force retiring Santana, and Hernandez grounded out and ended the inning.

Staked to an 8–5 lead, Orosco faced Ed Romero, who took over at shortstop for Owen in the eighth, to start the top of the ninth and retired him on a foul pop. Boggs then grounded out to Backman at second, leaving Barrett as the last hope for the Red Sox. Orosco worked a 2–2 count before getting Barrett to swing and miss, then tossed his glove high into the air and dropped to his knees as the Mets all converged on the mound to celebrate their world championship victory.

McDowell was awarded the victory, with Orosco garnering his second save of the series. Schiraldi was saddled with the loss for the second consecutive game, having been charged with all three runs the Mets scored in the seventh in one-third of an inning. He gave up seven runs in his final two outings of the series.

Due to the rainout, this game coincided with another sporting event taking place in the New York metropolitan area that night. The New York Giants were taking on the Washington Redskins at Giants Stadium on Monday Night Football, with the kickoff happening approximately thirty minutes after Game 7 started. Many of the fans at the football game, which sold out, were following along with the baseball game and cheering loudly during high points of the game. When Orosco recorded the final out, the Giants were driving late in the third quarter and a collective roar went up from the crowd as the stadium scoreboard operator flashed “METS WIN” on the board to inform the fans of the result. The Giants would later win Super Bowl XXI, following in the Mets lead in winning their championship.

Awards and statistical summary
The World Series MVP was awarded to Ray Knight, who led the Mets' regulars with nine hits and a .393 average in the series. He also recorded five runs batted in, second to Gary Carter's nine. 

Marty Barrett, in a losing effort, recorded 13 hits — tying the single World Series record — and a .433 average. Dave Henderson recorded ten hits and a .400 average, while Jim Rice and Wade Boggs each had nine hits.

Despite the struggles both pitchers faced in Game 7, both Bruce Hurst and Ron Darling were the best starting pitchers on their respective staffs during the World Series. Both finished with 2–0 records and sub-2.00 ERAs, with Darling's 1.35 ERA topping Hurst's 1.96 although Hurst issued fewer walks and struck out more batters.

The only other starter to win a decision was Bob Ojeda. Steve Crawford won Game 2 for the Red Sox while Rick Aguilera and Roger McDowell won Games 6 and 7 for the Mets. In fact, the record for the starting pitchers for both teams outside of Darling and Hurst was 1–4, with two of those losses recorded by Mets ace Dwight Gooden. His counterpart on the Red Sox, eventual Cy Young Award winner Roger Clemens, did not record a decision in either of his starts.

Postscript
Both the Mets and Red Sox would go without reaching the World Series for some time. The Red Sox would not return until 2004, where they would finally break through and win their first title since 1918. They have gone on to win three additional world championships, most recently in 2018.

The Mets have returned to the World Series twice since 1986. In 2000, the first time since 1956 that two teams from the same city faced each other in the World Series, the Mets lost to the New York Yankees. The Mets returned in 2015, only to lose again to the Kansas City Royals.

Neither Davey Johnson nor John McNamara would manage in another World Series. Johnson stayed on with the Mets until 1990, leading them to another postseason berth in 1988 that ended with a loss to the Los Angeles Dodgers in the National League Championship Series. He was fired early in the 1990 season. Johnson would later lead the Cincinnati Reds to the playoffs in 1995, then followed that with two more playoff runs with the Baltimore Orioles in 1996 and 1997. He finished his managerial career in 2013 with the Washington Nationals.

McNamara returned for 1987 with the Red Sox, but the team regressed significantly, finishing with only 78 wins. He would be fired the next year with the Red Sox barely above .500 at the All-Star break, and his successor Joe Morgan led the team to a comeback and division title. He would take over the Cleveland Indians in 1990, but was fired midway through 1991 with the team at 25–52. He would only manage once more after that, an interim position with the California Angels in 1996, before retiring. He died in July 2020 at the age of 88.

Bill Buckner never did win that elusive World Series ring. He would be released by the Red Sox during the 1987 season, then spend the rest of the year with the California Angels. In 1988, he signed with the Kansas City Royals and played more of a reserve role for the last three years of his career, which ended in 1990 after a second stint with the Red Sox. Buckner's error made him a scapegoat in Red Sox fans' eyes for some time afterward, but following their world championship victory in 2004 the fanbase began to embrace him again. In his later years, Buckner developed Lewy body dementia, and he died from complications at the age of 69 in May 2019.

Hedge fund manager and current Mets owner, Steven A. Cohen, revealed in an interview that he currently owns the Buckner ball from Game 6. He has stated that he would donate the ball to the Mets Museum at Citi Field.

In 2020, ESPN named the 1986 World Series the fourth greatest of all-time.

On September 14 and 15, 2021, ESPN premiered Once Upon a Time in Queens, its four-part 30 for 30 documentary about the 1986 World Series, the Mets' seasons leading up to it and the aftermath. The film is directed by Nick Davis.

After seven years, this would be the final World Series to use the logo introduced in the 1980 series. Beginning the next year, a new logo in the style of a baseball diamond was introduced. The logo itself would receive minor updates throughout the years. In 1992, gold lettering was added which would remain for the rest of its tenure until it was retired altogether after the 1997 series.

Composite line score
1986 World Series (4–3): New York Mets (N.L.) beat Boston Red Sox (A.L.)

Broadcast
Game 6 did not end until 12:32 a.m. Eastern, causing the first cancellation of an episode of NBC's Saturday Night Live in the show's history. The episode, hosted by Rosanna Arquette and scheduled to air live at 11:30 p.m. Eastern, was instead recorded for the studio audience beginning at 1:30 a.m., and aired November 8 with a comedic apology from Ron Darling. (NBC generally no longer schedules first-run SNL episodes on the same night as sports coverage.)

NBC's broadcast of Game 7 (which went up against a Monday Night Football game between the Washington Redskins and New York Giants on ABC) garnered a Nielsen rating of 38.9 and a 55 share, making it the highest-rated single World Series game to date.

In popular culture
In the 1998 film Rounders, Matt Damon's character (Mike McDermott) references Game 6 while returning into Teddy KGB's place in the final scene. "I feel like Buckner walking back into Shea."

In the 2005 film Fever Pitch, the main character played by Jimmy Fallon, a die hard Red Sox fan, watches a tape of the ending to Game 6 to get over what looks to be his break up with his girlfriend.

The collapse of the Boston Red Sox in Game 6 and Game 7 prompted a series of articles by George Vecsey of The New York Times, in which he mentions a "Babe Ruth Curse." Although it had long been noted that the selling of Babe Ruth to the New York Yankees had marked the beginning of a down period in the Red Sox's fortunes, this was one of the first instances, if not the first, in which mention of a "curse" was made.  The term "Curse of the Bambino" was not in common use by the press during the 1920s, nor can it be found through the 1970s, as a search of historical newspapers will illustrate. In fact, even though Vecsey's articles mention a "Babe Ruth Curse", the New York Times did not use the phrase "Curse of the Bambino" until 1990, the year that Dan Shaughnessy's book of the same name and a Boston Globe article about it were published.  Shaughnessy's book The Curse of the Bambino helped that phrase become a key part of the Red Sox lore in the media thereafter.

The dramatic sixth game was the subject of Game 6, a 2005 independent film starring Michael Keaton, based on a 1991 screenplay by novelist Don DeLillo.

Village Voice film critic J. Hoberman included Game 6 in his list of the top ten films of 1986.

In his song "Faith and Fear in Flushing Meadows", twee/folk artist Harry Breitner makes mention of Ray Knight and Mookie Wilson.

The game, or more specifically an infamous jeer that was issued in the game against Darryl Strawberry, was referenced in The Simpsons episode "Homer at the Bat" where Bart and Lisa jeer Strawberry the exact same way due to being sore over his forcing Homer to remain on the bench.

NBC's telecast of the Series ended with the song "Limelight" from Stereotomy, a penultimate album of The Alan Parsons Project.

The Series, and especially Game 6, were referenced in the Seinfeld episode "The Boyfriend", which also guest starred former Mets player Keith Hernandez. Hernandez being referred to Game 6 in the episode suggested that he was part of the winning rally, even though he was the 2nd (and final) out of the inning, though Hernandez was a big part of the prior round's Game 6 rally in the 9th inning.

In a 1999 episode of The King of Queens, Doug Heffernan promises Richie Ianucci that they will watch the Series that is being rerun on TV, only to abandon him for Ray Barone, who invites him to play golf (with Arthur Spooner tagging along) until a rainstorm ends their plans. In another episode from the same year, Doug and his cousin Danny bring up the Series while revisiting their high school years.

In the Curb Your Enthusiasm episode "Mister Softee", Bill Buckner appears as a guest star and mocks his famous 1986 mishap by missing a crucial catch of a Mookie Wilson-signed baseball. As the episode concludes, he redeems himself by catching a baby thrown from a burning building.

In 2001, playwright David Kruh had his play Curse of the Bambino premiere at the Boston Lyric Stage. After the 2004 World Series it was rewritten with a happier ending.

In Ron Darling's book, 108 Stitches, he claims that during Game 3. Lenny Dykstra used racial epithets toward Oil Can Boyd. Dykstra sued Darling over this.  The case was later dismissed.

In the 2005 film Bewitched starring Will Ferrell and Nicole Kidman, there's scene in which Jack (Ferrell) asks Isabel (Kidman) if her parents were in the witch business, Isabel answered that both her parents are and that her mother fixed the 1986 World Series.

In the Boy Meets World episode "Career Day" Cory is embarrassed by his dad Allen's presentation of his career as a grocer in front of the class. When he talks to Shawn about this in the lunchroom, he references the Bill Buckner play. "Do you remember that uh, that World Series game where the first baseman let that EASY ground ball go under his legs and his team lost and he was humiliated in front of the entire world? (Shawn replies "Yeah?") I envy his son." Later in the episode, Allen uses the same analogy while talking to his wife at home. "Do you remember the World Series where that first baseman let that grounder dribble through his uh, legs? (Yeah?) I envy him."

See also 
 Michael Sergio – a fan who was arrested and imprisoned for parachuting into Shea Stadium during Game 6 of the 1986 World Series, wearing a sign proclaiming "Go Mets".
 1986 Japan Series

Notes and references

Further reading

External links

1986 NLCS: Game 1 at MLB.com
1986 ALCS: Game 5 at MLB.com
1986 NLCS: Game 6 at MLB.com
Good To The Very Last Out at SI.com
1986 New York Mets at baseballlibrary.com
1986 Boston Red Sox at baseballlibrary.com
Game 7, Marty Barrett vs. Jesse Orosco: NBC TV version – Vin Scully & Joe Garagiola
The Ultimate Mets Database – 1986 World Series
Game 6 Memories
Game 7 Memories
Re-creating a classic
Mets Win World Series – Bob Murphy Call

Mookie Wilson's at bat
(Audio call)
NBC TV version with audio from WHN – Bob Murphy

World Series
World Series
New York Mets postseason
Boston Red Sox postseason
World Series
World Series
World Series
World Series
Baseball competitions in Boston
Baseball competitions in New York City
1980s in Queens